Fadila Mujkić (born 26 December 2002) is a Bosnia and Herzegovina footballer who plays as a forward for Ženska Premijer Liga BiH club ŽNK SFK 2000 Sarajevo and the Bosnia and Herzegovina women's national team.

References

2002 births
Living people
Women's association football forwards
Bosnia and Herzegovina women's footballers
Bosnia and Herzegovina women's international footballers